Les Luthiers (volumen 7), album released in August, 1983.

Track listing

Side one
 "El Lago Encantado"

Side two
 "Marcha de la Conquista"
 "Papa Garland had a hat and a Jazz Band and a mat and a black fat cat (rag)"
 "Homenaje a Huesito Williams"
 "L´otro día caminando"
 "Siento algo por tí"
 "Dime si ella"
 "El teléfono del amor"

Les Luthiers albums
1983 albums
1980s comedy albums